Aeneas of Gaza (d. c. 518) was a Neo-Platonic philosopher and a convert to Christianity who flourished towards the end of the fifth century. In a dialogue entitled Theophrastus, he alludes to Hierocles of Alexandria as his teacher, and in some of his letters he mentions as his contemporaries writers whom we know to have lived at the end of the fifth century and the beginning of the sixth, such as Procopius of Gaza. He is considered part of the Rhetorical School of Gaza, which flourished in Byzantine Palaestina in the fifth and sixth centuries.  

Like all the Christian Neo-Platonists, Aeneas held Plato in higher esteem than Aristotle. Like Synesius, Nemesius, and others, he found in Neo-Platonism the philosophical system which best accorded with Christian revelation. But, unlike Synesius and Nemesius, he rejected some of the most characteristic doctrines of the Neo-Platonists as being inconsistent with Christian dogma. For instance, he rejected the doctrine of pre-existence (according to which the soul of man existed before its union with body), arguing that the soul before its union with the body would have been "idle", incapable of exercising any of its faculties. Similarly, he rejected the doctrine of the eternal duration of the world, on the ground that the world is corporeal, and, although the best possible "mechanism", contains in itself the elements of dissolution Again, he taught that "man's body is composed of matter and form", and that while the matter perishes the "form" of the body retains the power of resuscitating the "matter" on the last day.

See also
 The Gaza Triad
 Neoplatonism and Christianity
 The Rhetorical School of Gaza

References

Sources
 Aeneas of Gaza, Theophrastus, transl. by John Dillon and Donald Russell. With Zacharias of Mytilene, Ammonius, transl. by Sebastian Gertz, coll. Ancient commentators on Aristotle, London, Bristol Classical Press, 2012.
 Michael W. Champion, Explaining the cosmos : creation and cultural interaction in late-antique Gaza, coll. Oxford studies in late antiquity, Oxford, Oxford University Press, 2014.
 Manfred Wacht, Aeneas von Gaza als Apologet : seine Kosmologie im Verhältnis zum Platonismus, coll. Theophaneia, Bonn, Hanstein, 1969.

5th-century births
5th-century Christians
6th-century Christians
5th-century philosophers
6th-century philosophers
6th-century deaths
Converts to Christianity from pagan religions
Christian philosophers
Neoplatonists
People from Gaza City
5th-century Byzantine writers